San Ignacio is a municipality of El Salvador.

It is located in the department of Chalatenango, to a distance of 87 km. from San Salvador, and to 8 km. of the international border with Honduras.

This municipality takes his name in honor to Ignatius of Loyola. Their celebrations are from July 23 to July 31.

Geography 
Altitude: From 1010m to 2750m over the sea level
Area: 69.15 km²
Population: 16,000 inhabitants
Climate: Fresh/Cool
Townships: "Las Pilas", "El Centro", "Río Chiquito", "El Rosario", "Santa Rosa", "El Carmen" and "El Pinar".
Rivers:"Sumpul", "Los Pozos", "San Ignacio", "Nonuapa", "Jupula", "Río Chiquito".

Tourism 

San Ignacio represents one of the most important points of attraction in El Salvador, thanks to its pleasant climate and beautiful mountains.
There we can find the highest mountain in the country: the "Cerro El Pital" (The Pital Hill) near "Las Pilas" corner with 2730m over the sea level, where we can find a variety of fruits and vegetables nonseen in another point of the country making this place, maybe, the most important vegetables source for the country.

Resources

References 
 
 

Municipalities of the Chalatenango Department